Xavier Tilliette (23 July 1921, Corbie, Somme – 10 December 2018, Paris) was a French philosopher, historian of philosophy, and theologian. A former student of Jean Wahl and of Vladimir Jankélévitch, he was a member of the Society of Jesus (1938) and professor emeritus at the Catholic Institute of Paris (1969), having taught also at the  Pontifical Gregorian University of Rome (1972), the Lateran University, and the Centre Sèvres in Paris.

Biography
Xavier Tilliette also taught philosophy at various universities as a "visiting professor" in France and abroad: Lima, Santiago, Berlin, Bremen, Fribourg, Heidelberg, Hamburg, Munich, Bonn, Tübingen, Turin, Ferrara, Urbino, Rome, Macerata, Naples, Palermo. He spoke fluent English, Italian, German and Spanish, in addition to Latin, Greek and Hebrew, and he read Portuguese and Danish.

A specialist in Schelling and Jaspers, he has been developing since the 1970s a "philosophical Christology" which he initiated. In the tradition of Schelling and of Maurice Blondel, he defended and illustrated the idea of a Christian philosophy born from Revelation. He was also a specialist of Claudel, of phenomenology (Husserl and Maurice Merleau-Ponty), and of German idealism.

Xavier Tilliette was twice winner of a prize from the French Academy. Several of his works were translated into English, Italian, German, and Spanish.

Among his teachers, disciples, or friends, along with Wahl and Jankélévitch, were Hans Urs von Balthasar, Karl Rahner, Henri de Lubac, Gaston Fessard, Hans Georg Gadamer, Jürgen Habermas, Maurice Merleau-Ponty, Jean-Paul Sartre, Louis Bouyer, Jean Daniélou, Emmanuel Levinas, Paul Ricœur, Gabriel Marcel, Ambroise-Marie Carré, Yves Congar, Michel de Certeau, Stanislas Fumet, Maurice de Gandillac, Paul Doncœur, Pierre Blet, Marcel Brion, Robert Bresson, Enrico Castelli, Luigi Pareyson, Giuseppe Riconda, Michel Henry, Claude Bruaire, Jean Greisch, François Varillon, Albert Vanhoye, Jean-Luc Marion, Jean-Louis Vieillard-Baron, Francesco Tomatis.

He was a member of the Istituto Italiano per gli Studi Filosofici and of the Bavarian Academy of Sciences and Humanities (Bayerische Akademie der Wissenschaften of Munich), the Centro studi filosofico-religiosi Luigi Pareyson, and, since 2006, a corresponding member Accademia di estetica internazionale de Rapallo.

Xavier Tilliette was knight of the Légion d'honneur and of the Order of Merit of the Italian Republic. Tilliette died in Paris on 10 December 2018 at the age of 97.

Selected bibliography
Xavier Tilliette wrote more than 2,000 essays, books, or articles; his more comprehensive bibliography contains over 250 pages.

Books in French
 1960 Karl Jaspers, Aubier, coll. « Théologie »
 1962 Existence et Littérature, Desclée de Brouwer
 1962 Philosophes contemporains, Gabriel Marcel, Maurice Merleau-Ponty, Karl Jaspers, Desclée de Brouwer
 1964 Jules Lequier ou le tourment de la liberté, Desclée de Brouwer
 1970 Maurice Merleau-Ponty ou la mesure de l'homme, Seghers
 1970 Schelling. Une philosophie en devenir, t. I, Le Système vivant, 1794–1821, t. II, La Dernière Philosophie, 1821–1854, Vrin, rééd. 1992
 1974–1977 Le Christ des philosophes, 3 fascicules, ICP
 1978 Schelling. Textes esthétiques. Présentation et notes, Klincksieck, coll. « L'esprit et les formes »
 1984 La Mythologie comprise. L'interprétation schellingienne du paganisme, Bibliopolis, Naples
 1986 La Christologie idéaliste, préface de Joseph Doré, Desclée de Brouwer, coll. « Jésus et Jésus-Christ », 240 p.
 1987 L'Absolu et la Philosophie. Essais sur Schelling, coll. « Épiméthée », PUF
 1990 Le Christ de la philosophie, Cerf, coll. « Cogitatio Fidei », 295 p., prix Montyon de l'Académie française 1991
 1992 La Semaine sainte des philosophes, Desclée, coll. « Jésus et Jésus-Christ »
 1993 Le Christ des philosophes : Du Maître de sagesse au divin Témoin, Culture et Vérité, Namur
 1995 Recherches sur l'intuition intellectuelle, de Kant à Hegel, Vrin
 1999 Schelling, Biographie, Calmann-Lévy, coll. « La vie des philosophes »
 2001 Les philosophes lisent la Bible, Cerf, 200 p., prix du Cardinal Grente de l'Académie française ainsi que pour l'ensemble de son œuvre
 2001 La Mémoire et l'Invisible, éd. Ad Solem, Genève
 2002 Jésus romantique, Desclée-Mame
 2003 Fichte. La science de la liberté, préface de , Vrin
 2005 Le Jésuite et le Poète, Éloge jubilaire à Paul Claudel, éd. de Paris, Versailles
 2006 L'Église des philosophes, de Nicolas de Cuse à Gabriel Marcel, Cerf Recension en ligne in Esprit & Vie
 2006 Philosophies eucharistiques, de Descartes à Blondel, Cerf, 180 p., médaille Humboldt 2006
 2007 Une introduction à Schelling, Honoré Champion

With other authors
 Jean Wahl et Gabriel Marcel, avec Emmanuel Lévinas et Paul Ricœur, Beauchesne, 1976, 96 p., 
 Hommage au Père Marcel Régnier, Archives de philosophie, 1999, Présentation en ligne

Written in Italian or in German
 Il Cristo dei non-credenti e altri saggi di filosofia cristiana, Editoria Ave, Roma, 1994
 Omaggi, Filosofi italiani del nostro tempo : Michele Federico Sciacca, Enrico Castelli Gattinara di Zubiena, Luigi Pareyson, Augusto Del Noce, Alberto Caracciolo, Italo Mancini, Enrico Garulli, Arturo Massolo, Pasquale Salvucci, Morcelliana, Brescia, 1997, 92 p.
 Del male e del bene, con Giuseppe Riconda (a cura di Francesco Tomatis), Città Nuova Editrice, Roma, 2001
 Che cos'è cristologia filosofica, Morcelliana, 2004
 Schellings Pyrmonter Elegie. Der Briefwechsel mit Eliza Tapp, 1849–1854 (en collaboration), V. Klostermann, Frankfurt-am-Main, 2000

Essays published in the following reviews
 Étvdes
 Recherches de science religieuse
 Revue de métaphysique et de morale
 Archives de philosophie
 Communio
 Christus

References

Further reading
 La filosofia come santità della ragione. Scritti in onore di Xavier Tilliette, A cura di Antonio Russo & Jean-Louis Vieillard-Baron, Edizioni Università di Trieste, 2004
 Simone Stancampiano, La cristologia filosofica in Xavier Tilliette, Centro Studi Luigi Pareyson, Trauben, 2007 (online)

External links
 Revue Conférence, 2007, « Jean Wahl, mendiant de Dieu » by Xavier Tilliette
 « Rosenzweig, philosophe de la religion » by Xavier Tilliette
 Deutschen Nationalbibliothek

1921 births
2018 deaths
People from Corbie
20th-century French Jesuits
21st-century French Jesuits
French historians of philosophy
Jesuit theologians
Catholic philosophers
French film critics
Phenomenologists
20th-century French philosophers
21st-century French philosophers
20th-century French Catholic theologians
21st-century French Catholic theologians
Chevaliers of the Légion d'honneur
French male writers